BJP Mahila Morcha, or simply Mahila Morcha (IPA: Mahilā Mōrcā), is the women's wing of the Bharatiya Janata Party  (BJP) of India. Vanathi Srinivasan, former Tamil Nadu BJP Unit Vice president and current Member of the Tamil Nadu Legislative Assembly from Coimbatore South state assembly constituency is the national president of the wing.

Campaigns

In September 2019 the Mahila Morcha used the Durga Puja festival in a campaign to spread the BJP party's message to women particularly on Article 370 and the National Register of Citizens (NRC).

Controversies
In August 2022, Seema Patra, member of the national working committee of the BJP's women's wing, allegedly tortured a domestic worker named Sunita. Several videos that were circulated online showed Sunita narrating her stories. Injuries on her body were visible, she was unable to sit and her teeth was smashed. She alleged that her teeth were broken with an iron rod and that she was forced to lick urine, and clean the floor with her tongue. When she asked permission to go back to home, she was beaten up and locked. Seema kept the worker captive for around 10 years. When the video went viral, BJP suspended Seema Patra from the party, with Jharkhand BJP president Deepak Prakash ordering action against her. The next day, Jharkhand Police arrested due to  the allegations.

See also

 Vanathi Srinivasan, President of Mahila Morcha
 Bharatiya Janata Party, The parent political party 
 Bharatiya Janata Yuva Morcha, The youth wing of the BJP
 BJP Minority Morcha, A BJP wing for minorities
 All India Mahila Congress, comparable Women's wing of opposition party

References

 
 
 
 

Bharatiya Janata Party organisations
Women's wings of political parties in India
Organizations established in 1980
1980 establishments in India